The Roman Catholic Diocese of Itumbiara is a diocese located in the city of Itumbiara in the Ecclesiastical province of Goiânia in Brazil.

History
 October 11, 1966: Established as Diocese of Itumbiara from the Metropolitan Archdiocese of Goiânia

Leadership, in reverse chronological order
 Bishops of Itumbiara (Roman rite)
 Bishop Fernando Antônio Brochini, C.S.S. (2014.10.15 - 2003. 06. 25)
 Bishop Antônio Lino da Silva Dinis (1999.02.24 – 2013.12.01)
 Bishop Celso Pereira de Almeida, O.P. (1995.01.25 – 1998.05.06)
 Bishop José Carlos Castanho de Almeida (1987.09.05 – 1994.03.23), appointed Bishop of Araçatuba, São Paulo
 Bishop José Belvino do Nascimento (1981.06.27 – 1987.02.06), appointed Coadjutor Bishop of Patos de Minas, Minas Gerais
 Bishop José de Lima (1973.04.13 – 1981.06.07), appointed Bishop of Sete Lagoas, Minas Gerais
 Bishop José Francisco Versiani Velloso (1966.10.27 – 1972.05.17)

References

 GCatholic.org
 Catholic Hierarchy
  Diocese website (Portuguese)

Roman Catholic dioceses in Brazil
Christian organizations established in 1966
Itumbiara, Roman Catholic Diocese of
Roman Catholic dioceses and prelatures established in the 20th century